Viking Hall is a 6,100-seat multi-purpose arena in Bristol, Tennessee, USA. Opened in 1981, the facility is the home arena and aquatic center for Bristol Tennessee High School. It was formerly operated by the City of Bristol but is now managed by Bristol Tennessee City Schools.  The facility is now for the exclusive use of Tennessee High School.

Viking Hall was the site of considerable controversy when White Zombie came to perform in the early 1990s and local churches came to protest Rob Zombie's purported "connection to Satan."

In 2010 Highlands Fellowship celebrated their 15th Anniversary at Viking Hall on Easter Sunday, breaking all previous attendance records at the Civic Center. The local fire marshall closed the doors after reaching beyond its capacity. He estimated over 8000 people in attendance which included over 2000 outside who could not get in.

References

Sports venues in Tennessee
Indoor arenas in Tennessee
Buildings and structures in Sullivan County, Tennessee
Music venues in East Tennessee